Melanie Kraus (born 24 October 1974 in Mönchengladbach) is a German long-distance runner who specialises in track events and the marathon. She has won the Frankfurt Marathon. She represented Germany at the 2008 Summer Olympics.

In 2001, she competed in the women's marathon at the 2001 World Championships in Athletics held in Edmonton, Alberta, Canada. She finished in 23rd place.

References

External links
 
 Profile at sports-reference.com
 Leverkusen who's who

1974 births
Living people
Sportspeople from Mönchengladbach
German female long-distance runners
German female marathon runners
German national athletics champions
Athletes (track and field) at the 2008 Summer Olympics
Olympic athletes of Germany
Frankfurt Marathon female winners
20th-century German women
21st-century German women